The Peninsula Football Association (PFA) is a former non-professional Australian Rules football league from south-eastern Tasmania, Australia that operated between 1988 and 2001.

Peninsula Football Association
The Peninsula Football Association was formed in 1988 after the withdrawal of the Nubeena Football Club from the Tasman Football Association.

The competition was among four clubs (Eaglehawk Neck, Nubeena, Port Arthur and Premaydena) and was completely amateur, umpired by players and former players, it also had no affiliation with any other senior football body within the State.
There were only two grounds in the competition (Nubeena and the Port Arthur Recreation Ground), therefore there were weekly double-headers at the host ground. 
Originally there were only three clubs but Eaglehawk Neck were formed in 1989 at the Lufra Hotel at Eaglehawk Neck and were admitted into the Association that season. 
The clubs' colours were: Nubeena (Black & Gold), Port Arthur (Maroon & White), Premaydena (Red & Black) and Eaglehawk Neck (Navy Blue with white "CFC" monogram). 
The best and fairest player in the Peninsula Football Association was awarded the A.V Noye Medal, whilst the premiership winner was awarded the A.V Noye Memorial Shield.
The Peninsula Football Association went into recess and promptly folded at the end of the 2001 season following the Premaydena Football Club's ongoing battle to find players became too great and the club folded.
As a result of the competition going out of business, all member clubs also closed down.

Premiers
1988 - Nubeena	14.15 (99) v Port Arthur 9.8 (62)
1989 - Nubeena	13.7 (85) v Port Arthur	11.11 (77)
1990 - Port Arthur 17.14 (116) v Eaglehawk Neck 6.8 (44)
1991 - Nubeena	16.13 (109) v Premaydena 5.11 (41)
1992 - Nubeena	19.24 (138) v Port Arthur 13.12 (90)
1993 - Eaglehawk Neck 20.12 (132) v Nubeena 6.4 (40)
1994 - Port Arthur 15.8 (98) v Eaglehawk Neck 9.12 (66)
1995 - Nubeena 14.13 (97) v Eaglehawk Neck 9.8	(62)
1996 - Eaglehawk Neck 9.8 (62) v Port Arthur 5.6 (36)
1997 - Nubeena 12.10 (82) v Eaglehawk Neck 8.7 (55)
1998 - Nubeena 4.11 (35) v Premaydena 7.11 (53)
1999 - Premaydena 12.9 (81) v Nubeena 4.13 (37) - Traun Lynch (Premaydena) dominated the goal square and kicked great goals
2000 - Eaglehawk Neck 15.10 (100) v Nubeena 14.7 (91)
2001 - Eaglehawk Neck 14.20 (104) v Port Arthur 11.4 (70)

Published books
Australian Rules football in Tasmania - John Stoward - 2002, 
More on football - B.T.(Buck) Anderton - Central Coast Courier, 2002, 

Defunct Australian rules football competitions in Tasmania